Christmas Is Here is the first Christmas album and third studio album recorded by Danny Gokey. BMG Records released the album on October 16, 2015. He worked with Keith Thomas, in the production of this album. An original track co-written by Gokey, "Lift Up Your Eyes", was released September 25, 2015 as the lead single. The album debuted at number one on the Billboard Top Holiday Albums chart and in the top 10 of the Christian and Independent albums charts.

Critical reception

Rating the album three and a half stars for CCM Magazine, Kevin Sparkman says, "Christmas may be here, but Danny Gokey's vocals are always in season." Caitlin Lassiter, indicating in a four star review by New Release Today, describes, "Christmas Is Here is a perfect example of how to take classic favorites and remake them into modern songs of holiday praise and worship." Joshua Andre, awarding the album four stars at 365 Days of Inspiring Media, writes, "Well done Danny for such a poignant, powerful and prolific Christmas album". Giving the album four stars from The Christian Beat, Sarah Baylor states, "Danny Gokey's Christmas Is Here is definitely the perfect album to get you in the holiday spirit."

Track listing

Chart performance

References 

2015 Christmas albums
Danny Gokey albums
Christmas albums by American artists